Riley Salmon (born July 2, 1976, in Amarillo, Texas) is a volleyball player from the United States.  He graduated from Clear Creek High School in League City, Texas, and played two years of varsity volleyball at Pierce College from 1994-96 before joining the men's national team in May 2001 as an outside hitter. He competed at the 2004 Olympics and the 2008 Olympics. At the 2008 Olympics, he helped Team USA win the gold medal.

In July 2009, it was announced that Salmon faced a four-month suspension by the FIVB for violating anti-doping policy rules. Salmon was taking Avapro, a medication approved by the FIVB for hypertension, however the drug's replacement Avalide contained a banned substance, hydrochlorothiazide. The FIVB stated that it was not intentional doping. The suspension period began on May 27, 2009.

In September 2009, it was announced that Salmon would play for Vivo/Minas, a big Brazilian team from Belo Horizonte - Minas Gerais. He will play beside two Brazilian players who were also at the Olympics in 2008: André Heller and André Nascimento.

Salmon is currently the head coach for the Concordia Irvine Eagles.

References

External links
 
 

1976 births
Living people
American men's volleyball players
Volleyball players at the 2004 Summer Olympics
Volleyball players at the 2008 Summer Olympics
Olympic gold medalists for the United States in volleyball
Sportspeople from Amarillo, Texas
Los Angeles Pierce College people
Medalists at the 2008 Summer Olympics
Olympiacos S.C. players
Aris V.C. players
PAOK V.C. players
Outside hitters
Doping cases in volleyball
American volleyball coaches